The 2012 VTR Open was a men's tennis tournament play on outdoor clay courts. It was the 19th edition of the VTR Open, and was part of the ATP World Tour 250 series of the 2012 ATP World Tour. It took place in Viña del Mar, Chile from January 28 through February 5, 2012. After two editions hosted in Santiago, the event returned to Viña del Mar.

Singles main draw entrants

Seeds

 Rankings are as of January 16, 2012

Other entrants
The following players received wildcards into the singles main draw:
  Paul Capdeville
  Fernando González
  Nicolás Massú

The following players received entry from the qualifying draw:
  Federico del Bonis
  Rogério Dutra da Silva
  Diego Junqueira
  Rubén Ramírez Hidalgo

Withdrawals
  Tommy Robredo (leg injury)

Doubles main draw entrants

Seeds

 Rankings are as of January 16, 2012

Other entrants
The following pairs received wildcards into the doubles main draw:
  Thomaz Bellucci /  Marcelo Melo
  Paul Capdeville /  Nicolás Massú
  Gonzalo Lama /  Matias Sborowitz

Finals

Singles

 Juan Mónaco defeated  Carlos Berlocq, 6–3, 6–7(1–7), 6–1
It was Monaco's 1st title of the year and 4th of his career, and first since 2007.

Doubles

 Frederico Gil /  Daniel Gimeno-Traver defeated  Pablo Andújar /  Carlos Berlocq, 1–6, 7–5, [12–10]

References

External links
 Official website 

VTR Open
Clay court tennis tournaments
Tennis tournaments in Chile
VTR Open